Lithophane hemina, the hemina pinion, is a species of cutworm or dart moth in the family Noctuidae. It is found in North America.

The MONA or Hodges number for Lithophane hemina is 9893.

References

Further reading

 
 
 

hemina
Articles created by Qbugbot
Moths described in 1874